In nephrology, vascular access steal syndrome is a syndrome caused by ischemia (not enough blood flow) resulting from a vascular access device (such as an arteriovenous fistula or synthetic vascular graft–AV fistula) that was installed to provide access for the inflow and outflow of blood during hemodialysis.

Signs
 Pallor
 Diminished pulses (distal to the fistula)
 Necrosis
 Decreased wrist-brachial index (ratio of blood pressure measured in the wrist and the blood pressure measured in the upper arm), especially if below 0.6

Symptoms
 Pain distal to the fistula.

Symptoms are graded by their severity:
 Grade 0: No symptoms of steal
 Grade 1: Mild - cool extremity, improvement in hand pulse with access occlusion
 Grade 2: Moderate - Ischemic symptoms during dialysis
 Grade 3: Severe - Ischemic hand pain outside of dialysis; Ulcers or gangrene of the fingers

Diagnosis
 History and physical exam - relief of symptoms with compression of the fistula on exam is highly suggestive of steal
 Arteriography
 Duplex ultrasound

Treatment
The fistula flow can be restricted through banding, or modulated through surgical revision.

Revascularization techniques
 Distal Revascularization and Interval Ligation (DRIL) procedure
 PAI (Proximalization of the Arterial Inflow)
 RUDI (Revision Using Distal Inflow)

Banding techniques
 Narrowing suture
 Plication
 Minimally invasive MILLER banding
 Tapering
 Surgical banding

If the above methods fail, the fistula is ligated, and a new fistula is created in a more proximal location in the same limb, or in the contralateral limb.

Incidence
DASS occurs in about 1% of AV fistulas and 2.7-8% of PTFE grafts.

Terminology
Within the contexts of nephrology and dialysis, vascular access steal syndrome is also less precisely just called steal syndrome (for short), but in wider contexts that term is ambiguous because it can refer to other steal syndromes, such as subclavian steal syndrome or coronary steal syndrome.

See also
 Terms for anatomical location

References

Nephrology
Vascular surgery
Renal dialysis
Syndromes